Qrr (Quorum regulatory RNA) is a non-coding RNA that is thought to be involved in the regulation of quorum sensing in Vibrio species. It is believed that these RNAs, guided by a protein, Hfq, can mediate the destabilisation of the quorum-sensing master regulators LuxR/HapR/VanT mRNAs.

Qrr operates as part of a negative feedback loop which regulates the shift in cell state from that of low density populations to that in high density populations. In Vibrio harveyi, Qrr binds and represses expression of the luxR mRNA transcript, a master regulator of quorum-sensing genes. At higher population densities, increased autoinducer concentration leads to termination of qrr transcription hence derepression of luxR.

There are 5 different qrr genes (Qrr1–5) in V. harveyi; of these, qrr2, 3 and 4 are activated by LuxR.

References

Further reading

External links
 

Non-coding RNA